Krupanj is a town and municipality located in the Mačva District of western Serbia. The municipality has a total population of 17,295 inhabitants, while the town has a population of 4,429 inhabitants (2011 census).

Geography
The town lies in western Serbia, at the southern border of the Pannonian plain and Mačva region. It is surrounded by the mountains Jagodnja, Boranja and Sokolska planina, in a valley intersected by several rivers and creeks. In the town itself, the rivers Bogoštica, Čađavica and Kržava conjoin into Likodra, which later empties into Jadar. The town lies at the altitude of 280 m.

It is the center of the region Rađevina, which was named after Rađ, a knight of Prince Lazar, who defended it from Hungarian and Ottoman conquerors, and who is buried at the monument of Rađev Kamen.

Settlements
Aside from the town of Krupanj, the municipality includes the following settlements:

Banjevac
Bela Crkva
Bogoštica
Brezovice
Brštica
Cerova
Cvetulja
Dvorska
Kostajnik
Krasava
Kržava
Likodra
Lipenović
Mojković
Planina
Ravnaja
Šljivova
Stave
Tolisavac
Tomanj
Vrbić
Zavlaka

History

Already in the Roman period, the mining was developed in the modern Rađevina area. In the Middle Ages, mining was resurrected with the employment of the Sasi mining engineers, while the main buyers were the Ragusans. The name 'Krupanj' was first recorded in Ragusan records on 27 July 1417. At the time, it was a silver mining site, frequented by Ragusan merchant caravans. Lead ore with a high content of silver was excavated at the Postenje and Jagodnja, and then transported across the Drina river, where it was melted in Srebrenica, which was a major silver processing center in the Balkans. This process also gave name to both settlements: larger lumps of ore were called "krupa" (hence, Krupanj) while the Serbian word for silver is "srebro" (Srebrenica).

According to the Ragusan papers, in the first half of the 15th century Krupanj already had a court and both the Catholic (Saint Peter and Paul) and Orthodox church (First Krupanj church in Dobri Potok). The settlement was quite developed when in 1459 fell under Ottoman rule with the rest of the Serbian Despotate. In the first wave of conquest, the Ottomans razed down the entire town, which was then rebuilt from scratch. Medieval remnants include numerous stećci with many bas-reliefs which points out to the Branković dynasty.

The Church of Dobri Potok (Dobropotočka crkva) at the town's outskirts, which is devoted to the Holy Ascension of God-bearer Mary, was first recorded in 1528 in Turkish records, making it the oldest preserved church in the Podrinje area. Built in a traditional style, it hosts a number of records and monuments from Ottoman Rule and the 'Serbian Liberation wars' period. It is surrounded by a small ethno-park with several chapels and museum rooms.

The town was first liberated in the First Serbian Uprising in 1804 by the hajduks company of Đorđe Obradović "Ćurčija". Vojvoda Maksim Krstić and count Krsto Ignjatović were leaders of the defense of Krupanj during the uprising. The first basic school in the town was opened in 1837, and the church of Holy Ascension was built in 1842. The Ottomans ultimately withdrew in 1862, and the nearby fortress called "Soko Grad" was torn down, to be turned into the monastery of St. Nicholas.

New, intensive mining period began in 1870, and lasted up to the 1960s. Focus was shifted to antimony, while production of zinc, silver, sulfur and iron ultimately failed. At the end of the 19th century, a lead-antimony smeltery was founded in the city. During World War I, a battle between Austria-Hungary and Serbian forces was fought at the nearby site of Mačkov kamen, the peak of Jagodnja mountain. A charnel house or memorial church is built in memory of the event 1930 when the bones of both Serbian soldier and Austrian aggressors were buried in the same ossuary.

Town's hospital was donated by the benefactor Nikola Spasić, Daily Politika donated the cultural center, in memory of its founders, brothers Darko F. Ribnikar and Vladislav F. Ribnikar, who were both killed in action in this area, fighting off Austro-Hungarian invading forces in 1914, during World War I. There are also court building, police building and hotel "Borac".

During World War II, in the village of Bela Crkva, partisan Žikica Jovanović Španac killed two gendarmes on 7 July 1941, which would become the official date of celebration of the people's uprising against occupiers in Serbia during communist rule. On 26 September 1941, a meeting of partisans' main headquarters, presided by Josip Broz Tito, was held in the nearby village of Stolice. A monument and memorial park were built after the war, celebrating the event. As the town was one of the centers of the Republic of Užice, it was burned to the ground by German occupiers in late 1941, with only a few buildings surviving.

During the war, antimony mining in Krupanj reached a peak, as German occupational forces pushed the smeltery to the maximum. Not counting the sickness, local population had no benefits from antimony production, before or after the war. Instead, they were mostly employed in agriculture, husbandry and forestry. The especially produced plums, which as prunes were exported even to the United States. Some  of wood yearly would be collected from the Boranja mountain.

In the second half of the 20th century, all mining activity ceased. Founded in 1957 in Loznica, cellulose "Viskoza" factory became one of the largest companies in western Serbia by the 1980s. Several companies in connection to factory were founded in time in Krupanj. After the collapse of "Viskoza" in the 1990s, all industrial activity in Krupanj halted also. By the early 2020s, operational were only few micro-companies in wood industry, and one small textile factory, founded in the late 2010s.

Krupanj was affected by significant flooding in May 2014. Many houses, roads and a bridge were completely destroyed.

Demographics

According to the 2011 census results, the municipality has a population of 17,295 inhabitants.

Ethnic groups
The ethnic composition of the municipality:

Economy
The following table gives a preview of total number of employed people per their core activity (as of 2017):

Tourism

There are two hotels in the town center. The Church of Good Creek is a preserved building of traditional sacral architecture. Several historical monuments from the World Wars include the ones at Stolice, Mačkov kamen and Cer mountain. The monastery of Tronoša and the ethno-park in nearby Tršić preserve the memory of Vuk Stefanović Karadžić, a 19th-century reformer of the Serbian language.

At the site of Mačkov kamen there is also a small ski resort. The area has some hiking and biking, and the creeks are rich in fish, especially trout; there is an organized fishing ground at the site of Zmajevac. Several sporting grounds (including a sports hall and Olympic-sized open swimming pool) offer support for sports tourism, used by sport clubs from Serbia and nearby countries.

A religious, three-part ethno-complex of Dobri Potok Church Park is built in the linden forest north of Krupanj, including the Church of the Feast of the Ascension. Forming of the complex began in 1987, though some edifices are much older, and some are in town itself. The lower, Mother of God Park includes the Church of the Dormition of the Mother of God (mentioned in 1528) with belfry and vault, a museum, paintings gallery and reception venue. Close to it is the underground Church of Saint Procopius in the former mining shaft, jointly with mining, pedagogic, hunting and beekeeping exhibitions. There is also a church dedicated to the Jugović brothers and a drinking fountain. The upper, Saint Sava Park, there is another underground church, dedicated to Saint Paraskeva, and the reconstructed village household from the 19th century. The third is a recreational Park of Archdeacon Stephen. Museum "Old Mansion" with a restaurant is in downtown Krupanj.

See also
Mačva District
Podrinje
Church of Holy Ascension, Krupanj

References

External links 

 
Krupanj Online

Populated places in Mačva District
Municipalities and cities of Šumadija and Western Serbia